Yangi Chinoz is an urban-type settlement in Tashkent Region, Uzbekistan. It is part of Chinoz District. The town population in 2005 was 3700 people.

References

Populated places in Tashkent Region
Urban-type settlements in Uzbekistan